Julia Görges and Anna-Lena Grönefeld were the defending champions, but decided not to compete.
Johanna Larsson and Jasmin Wöhr won the tournament, defeating Kristina Mladenovic and Katarzyna Piter in the final 6–3, 6–3.

Seeds

Draw

Draw

References
 Main Draw

E-Boks Sony Ericsson Open - Doubles
Danish Open (tennis)